Walter Luiz de Araújo (born 23 June 1990), simply known as Luizão, is a Brazilian professional footballer who last played for Viettel in the V.League 1.

References

External links

1990 births
Living people
Brazilian footballers
Association football defenders
Campeonato Brasileiro Série A players
Coritiba Foot Ball Club players